Rudometkin is a surname coming from Russian Рудомёткин, Rudomyotkin. Notable people with the surname include:

John Rudometkin (1940–2015), American basketball player
Maxim Rudometkin ( 1818–1877), presbyter of the sect of Spiritual Christian Molokan Jumpers